The British Rail Class 380 Desiro is a type of electric multiple-unit passenger train that operates on the National Rail network in Scotland, for ScotRail.

The Class 380 operates out of Glasgow Central, Glasgow Queen Street, Ardrossan Harbour, Largs, Edinburgh Waverley and Ayr.

The Siemens Desiro UK family also includes units of Classes 185, 350, 360, 444 and 450.

History 

The trains operate ScotRail services in the Ayrshire and Inverclyde region of Scotland and had originally been intended for the cancelled Glasgow Airport Rail Link.

The contract was awarded to Siemens and announced by Transport Scotland on 11 July 2008. A total of 38 units were ordered, comprising 22 three-car and 16 four-car units. All 38 units are owned by Eversholt Rail, a rolling stock company (ROSCO) that leases them to ScotRail.

Stations along the Ayrshire Coast Line and Inverclyde Line underwent platform extension works to allow the use of the longer trains. The trains were specified to have full access for disabled people and to have streamlined end corridor connections. On the unveiling of the first completed vehicle, it was announced that the fleet would be divided into two sub-groups, with the three-car units Class 380/0 and the four-car as Class 380/1. The first unit to be delivered arrived in the UK in August 2010.

In September 2010, commissioning of the fleet was suspended by ScotRail due to technical issues with the trains. The reliability issues and extended commissioning period resulted in an initially reduced service on parts of the ScotRail network, including the newly re-opened Airdrie-Bathgate line.

The fleet is based at Glasgow Shields Road TMD. Introduction of the fleet resulted in the cascading of the Class 334 "Juniper" and  fleet which previously operated the Ayrshire Coast Line and Inverclyde Line. The fleet also allowed the  fleet which operated on the North Berwick Line to be withdrawn and transferred to Northern Rail.

Operations 

, the Class 380 operates trains between Glasgow Central and Ayr, Largs, Ardrossan, Gourock, Wemyss Bay, Neilston, Newton, Edinburgh Waverley and Cathcart Circle. In addition, they also operated trains between Edinburgh and Glasgow Queen Street via Falkirk Grahamston, North Berwick and Dunbar for a time whilst awaiting the Class 385 introduction to service.

The fleet was introduced into public service in December 2010. 

In November 2012, the Class 380 started operating services on the Paisley Canal Line following the line's electrification.

Following the December 2014 timetable change, with the electrification of the Whifflet Line, services to Lanark were re-routed into Glasgow Central High Level. Alongside the usual Class 318 and Class 320 units, the Class 380 has been used on the route.

The Class 380 operated some services on the recently electrified line between Glasgow Queen Street and Edinburgh Waverley via Falkirk from December 2017, due to the late arrival of the  units.

Fleet details

Vehicle numbering
Individual vehicles are numbered in the ranges as follows:

References

External links 

380
Siemens multiple units
Rail transport in Scotland
Train-related introductions in 2010